Pittsburghia (minor planet designation: Pittsburghia) is an asteroid that is in orbit around the Sun 150 million miles from Earth.  It is named in honor of the city of Pittsburgh, Pennsylvania, and its scientific and industrial heritage that produced some of the finest astronomy equipment of the time .

References

External links
 
 

Background asteroids
Pittsburghia
Pittsburghia
S-type asteroids (SMASS)
19020429